Hawk Junction Water Aerodrome  is located on Hawk Lake near Hawk Junction, Ontario, Canada.

References

Registered aerodromes in Algoma District
Seaplane bases in Ontario